St. Francis Xavier's Church, Giriz is a Roman Catholic Church situated in the Giriz Parish in the recently created Vasai Diocese. It is located in the village of Giriz in the coastal  town of Vasai in the city of Vasai-Virar in Maharashtra State, India. This is a relatively new church built in the early 20th century for the Catholics of Giriz who were till then parishioners of the vast parish of St. Thomas, Sandor and Our Lady of Mercy, Merces. The Archbishop of Damaun recognized the hardship faced by the people of Giriz in attending services at St. Thomas, Sandor and Merces especially during 
monsoons.

Construction
A new church was commissioned and the foundation laid on February 14, 1917. The construction, that was completed a year later in 1918, was built by the village folk themselves "without foreign aid". The Patron saint of the new church was St.Francis Xavier (7 April 1506 – 3 December 1552).The church completed, Giriz became an independent parish with Fr. Augusto D’Souza, who had supervised the construction of the church from inception, as the first parish priest. Every year 3 December, which commemorates the death anniversary of St. Francis Xavier, is celebrated by the parishioners as the feast day. The new church is renovated and currently open for all.

Golden Jubilee
In 1968 the church and parish celebrated its Golden Jubilee. The vicar Fr. Francis Gratian Monteiro built a porch and the Marshal Pereira Community Hall to accommodate the growing population of Catholics. In 1977, the Vicar Fr. Dominic Pereira built a spacious extension of the Church and a new parochial house on the first floor both with German and diocesan aid and in May 1981 the two spires of the church were replaced by.

References

Roman Catholic churches in Maharashtra